In enzymology, a hydroxydechloroatrazine ethylaminohydrolase is an enzyme that catalyzes the chemical reaction

4-(ethylamino)-2-hydroxy-6-(isopropylamino)-1,3,5-triazine + H2O  N-isopropylammelide + ethylamine

Thus, the two substrates of this enzyme are 4-(ethylamino)-2-hydroxy-6-(isopropylamino)-1,3,5-triazine and H2O, whereas its two products are N-isopropylammelide and ethylamine.

This enzyme belongs to the family of hydrolases, those acting on carbon-nitrogen bonds other than peptide bonds, specifically in compounds that have not been otherwise categorized within EC number 3.5.  The systematic name of this enzyme class is 4-(ethylamino)-2-hydroxy-6-(isopropylamino)-1,3,5-triazine ethylaminohydrolase. Other names in common use include AtzB, and hydroxyatrazine ethylaminohydrolase.  This enzyme participates in atrazine degradation.

References 

 

EC 3.5.99
Enzymes of unknown structure